The Central District of Miandoab County is in West Azerbaijan province, Iran. At the National Census in 2006, its population was 197,791 in 49,046 households. The following census in 2011 counted 211,800 people in 59,967 households. At the latest census in 2016, the district had 225,345 inhabitants in 68,714 households.

References 

Miandoab County

Districts of West Azerbaijan Province

Populated places in West Azerbaijan Province

Populated places in Miandoab County